Edward Rustad (November 26, 1867 – November 25, 1936) was a member of the Minnesota Senate.

Biography
Rustad was born on November 26, 1867 in Columbia County, Wisconsin. He moved to Traverse County, Minnesota in 1880 and attended the University of Minnesota Law School. Rustad died in 1936 in Painesville, Ohio.

Career
Rustad was a member of the Senate from the 57th district from 1911 to 1914. From 1915 to 1918, he represented the 48th district. In addition, Rustad was auditor and attorney of Traverse County, as well as president and member of the council of Wheaton, Minnesota. He was a Republican. He also practiced law and was president of the Wheaton Bank.

References

People from Columbia County, Wisconsin
People from Traverse County, Minnesota
Businesspeople from Minnesota
Minnesota lawyers
County officials in Minnesota
Minnesota city council members
Republican Party Minnesota state senators
University of Minnesota Law School alumni
1867 births
1936 deaths